Kevin Yarde is a Canadian politician and former weather presenter who was elected to the Legislative Assembly of Ontario in the 2018 provincial election for the riding of Brampton North. Initially elected as a member of the Ontario New Democratic Party, he eventually left the party to sit as an independent.

He is part of Ontario's first ever Black Caucus, alongside NDP caucus colleagues Laura Mae Lindo, Faisal Hassan, Jill Andrew and Rima Berns-McGown.

While serving as a Member of Provincial Parliament, Yarde was employed by private security firms Sentinel Security and Nationwide Security Ltd.

Yarde did not receive his party's nomination as a candidate in the 2022 election, losing to Sandeep Singh, who unsuccessfully ran in Caledon Ward 2 in the 2018 municipal elections. Yarde was the only NDP incumbent MPP to not receive his party nomination. Subsequently, Yarde resigned from the NDP to sit as an independent MPP for the remainder of the 42nd Parliament of Ontario.

Prior to his election to the legislature, Yarde worked for The Weather Network.

Personal life and education
Yarde was born in Toronto and has never lived in Brampton, but has "longtime family roots in Brampton". He studied journalism at York University and Ryerson University, before beginning his television career on the Rogers TV community television network. He joined The Weather Network in 2001, first as a field correspondent and later as a studio host. Yarde is a member of the US-based National Association of Black Journalists and also a volunteer with the Toronto location of Covenant House, a shelter and support centre for homeless and at-risk youth.

He is a first cousin of drummer Tyler Stewart of the Barenaked Ladies.

Electoral record

References

Ontario New Democratic Party MPPs
21st-century Canadian politicians
Living people
Politicians from Brampton
Black Canadian politicians
Black Canadian broadcasters
Canadian television meteorologists
Year of birth missing (living people)
York University alumni
Toronto Metropolitan University alumni
Politicians from Toronto
Black Canadian scientists
Independent MPPs in Ontario
Politicians affected by a party expulsion process